Glaze or  glazing may refer to:

 Glaze (metallurgy), a layer of compacted sintered oxide formed on some metals
 Glaze (cooking technique), a coating of a glossy, often sweet, mixture applied to food
 Glaze (ice), a layer of ice caused by freezing rain 
 Glaze (painting technique), a layer of paint, thinned with a medium, so as to become somewhat transparent
 Glaze (surname)
 Glazing (window), a transparent part of a wall
 Ceramic glaze, a vitreous coating to a ceramic material whose primary purposes are decoration or protection
 Glazed (album), a 1993 album by the Canadian rock band Mystery Machine

See also
 Architectural glass, a building material typically used as transparent glazing material in the building envelope
 Glazing agent, food additives that provide shiny appearance or protective coating to foods
 Insulated glazing, a piece of glazing consisting of two or more layers separated by a spacer